

General

Pharmacology

Difference to ethanol

Characteristic

References

Alcohol
Drug-related lists
Comparison of psychoactive substances